Sauce for the Goose is a 1918 American silent comedy film directed by Walter Edwards and starring Constance Talmadge, Harrison Ford, and Vera Doria.

Cast
 Constance Talmadge as Kitty Constable 
 Harrison Ford as John Constable 
 Vera Doria as Mrs. Margaret Alloway 
 Harland Tucker as Harry Travers 
 Edna Mae Cooper as Mrs. Edith Darch 
 Louis Willoughby as Teddy Sylvester 
 Jane Keckley as Maid

References

Bibliography
 Jeanine Basinger. Silent Stars. Wesleyan University Press, 2000.

External links

1918 films
1918 comedy films
Silent American comedy films
Films directed by Walter Edwards
American silent feature films
1910s English-language films
American black-and-white films
Selznick Pictures films
1910s American films
English-language comedy films